Muḥammad ibn Yusuf al-Ilāqī was an eleventh-century Persian physician from Khorasan.

Contrary to Carl Brockelmann's information (GAL 1:485; Suppl. 1:887), Sharaf al-Zamān Muḥammad ibn ʿAlī al-Īlāqī of Bākharz (in Khorasān, Iran), who was most probably active in Balkh (today's Afghanistan), was not a figure of the 6th/12th century. He did not die in 536/1141 (in the battle of the Qatwan steppe) but most probably around 460/1068 and should be counted among Avicenna's (d. 429/1037) direct students. Al-Ilāqī produced an epitome of the first book of the Canons of Medicine by Avicenna which was known under various titles: Kitāb al-Fuṣūl al-Ilāqiyya ("The Aphorisms of al-Ilāqī") and Kitāb al-asbāb wa-al-`alāmāt ("The Book of Causes and Symptoms"). Al-Ilāqī's greatly abbreviated version of the first book of the Canon was very popular, and many copies have survived.

Sources

Richard Sellheim, Verzeichnis der orientalischen Handschriften in Deutschland. Band XVII. Reihe 4. Arabische Handschriften. Materialien zur arabischen Literaturgeschichte (Wiesbaden: F. Steiner, 1976), 147.
Carl Brockelmann, Geschichte der arabischen Litteratur, 1st edition, 2 vols. (Leiden: Brill, 1889–1936). Second edition, 2 vols. (Leiden: Brill, 1943–49). Page references will be to those of the first edition, with the 2nd edition page numbers given in parentheses., vol. 1, p. 485 (638).
Carl Brockelmann, Geschichte der arabischen Litteratur, Supplement, 3 vols. (Leiden: Brill, 1937–1942)., vol. 1, p. 887.
 D.M. Schullian and F.E. Sommer, A Catalogue of Incunabula and Manuscripts in the Army Medical Library (New York: Henry Schuman, [1950]), p. 325).
Lutz Richter-Bernburg, "Iran's Contribution to Medicine and Veterinary Science in Islam AD 100-900/AD 700-1500", in The Diffusion of Greco-Roman Medicine in the Middle East and the Caucasus, ed. J.A.C. Greppin, E. Savage-Smith, and J.L. Gueriguian (New York: Caravan Press, 1999).
Dimitri Gutas, "Notes & Texts for Cairo MSS, II", Manuscripts of the Middle East, vol. 2 (1987), p. 15 note 13.
A. Z. Iskandar, A Catalogue of Arabic Manuscripts on Medicine and Science in the Wellcome Historical Medical Library (London: The Wellcome Historical Medical Library, 1967)., pp. 51–2.
 Sami Hamarneh, "Arabic Manuscripts of the National Library of Medicine, Washington, D.C.," Journal for the History of Arabic Science, 1977, vol. 1, pp. 72–103. p. 91.
A.Z. Iskandar, A Descriptive List of Arabic Manuscripts on Medicine and Science at the University of California, Los Angeles (Leiden: Brill, 1984). p. 42.

See also
List of Iranian scientists

11th-century Iranian physicians
Pupils of Avicenna
1068 deaths
Year of birth unknown
People from Nishapur